The 2007 AFC Champions League was the 26th edition of the top-level Asian club football tournament and the 5th edition under the current AFC Champions League title.

Japanese side Urawa Red Diamonds became champions for the first time, beating Sepahan of Iran and becoming the fourth Japanese club to win the Asian championship, and qualified for the 2007 FIFA Club World Cup.

Participating clubs
Along with the defending champion, Jeonbuk Hyundai Motors, 28 other clubs from fourteen countries qualified based on performance in domestic league and cup competitions. Jeonbuk Hyundai Motors entered the competition at the quarter-finals.

The draw took place in Kuala Lumpur on 22 December, allocating teams into seven groups. In February, the AFC disqualified Esteghlal Tehran from Group B for failing to register their players in time. This reduced the number of competing teams to 28.

Format
Group Stage
A total of 28 clubs were divided into 7 groups of four, based on region i.e. East Asian and Southeast Asian clubs were drawn in groups E to G, while the rest were grouped in groups A to D. Each club played double round-robin (home and away) against fellow three group members, a total of 6 matches each. Clubs received 3pts for a win, 1pt for a tie, 0pts for a loss. The clubs were ranked according to points and tie breakers were in the following order:
 Points earned between the clubs in question
 Goal Differential between the clubs in question
 Points earned within the group
 Goal Differential within the group
 Goals For within the group

The seven group winners along with the defending champion advanced to the quarter-finals.

Knockout Round
All eight clubs were randomly matched; however, the only restriction was that the clubs from the same country could not face each other in the quarter-finals. The games were conducted in 2 legs, home and away, and the aggregate score decided the match winner. If the aggregate score couldn't produce a winner, "away goals rule" was used. If still tied, clubs played extra time, where "away goals rule" still applied. If still tied, the game went to penalties.

Group stage
Group matches were scheduled to be played over match days on 7 March 21 March 11 April 25 April 9 and 23 May 2007.

Group A

Group B

Group C

Group D

Group E

Group F

Group G

Knock-out stage

Bracket

Quarter-finals

First leg

Second leg

Sepahan progress 5–4 on penalties after 0–0 aggregate score

Al-Wahda progress on away goals rule with 1–1 aggregate score

Seongnam Ilhwa Chunma progress 4–1 on aggregate

Urawa Red Diamonds progress 4–1 on aggregate

Semi-finals

First leg

Second leg

Urawa Red Diamonds progress 5–3 on penalties after 4–4 aggregate score

Sepahan progress 3–1 on aggregate

Final

First leg

Second leg

Urawa Red Diamonds win 3–1 on aggregate

Top scorers

See also
2007 FIFA Club World Cup

External links
AFC Champions League Official Page (English)
AFC Calendar of Events 2007
Champions League 2007, Group Stage Draw from official site.
Champions League 2007, Knockout Stage Draw from official site.

References

 
2007
1